

Background
In Bhutan, hot spring is locally known as Tshachu and the mineral water as Drubchu. There is another kind of water known as smenchu (medicinal water). Spiritually, it is believed that tshachu, drubchu and smenchu owe their origin to the good wishes and blessings  of  Buddhas  and  Boddhisattavas.  Hence,  most of these types of water are found in the areas of gNyes (sacred sites). Tshachu is the most popular one among the Bhutanese. Unlike in other countries, where tshachu is more commonly used for recreation and relaxation, in Bhutan it is mainly used as a  therapy  for  treating  diseases. Mindful of the health benefits that tshachu deliver to the Bhutanese people, the Institute of Traditional Medicine Services documented and classified the tshachu according to the therapeutic properties described in the ancient gSo-ba Rig-pa textbook. According to this textbook, tshachu contain a combination of rdo-sol (coal), mu-zi (sulphur)  and  rdo-sho (limestone). Because of the presence of these minerals most  of  the  tshachu have  medicinal  value. In 2007, Wangchuk and Dorji first reported on the history and spiritual benefits of tshachus in Bhutan and also provided a list of popular tshachus. In 2011, Wangchuk gave detailed explanation and description of different types of tshachu, drubchu and smenchu in his book chapter on 'An Indigenous Panacea of Bhutan' written for the Intangible Cultural Heritage of Bhutan, Paro Museum. In 2014, Wangdi and Wangdi described a list of tshachus and drubchus, which are provided below.

Hot springs
 Chuboog Tshachu (Punakha)
 Koma Tshachu (Punakha)
 Gasa Tsachu (Gasa)
 Wachey Tsachu
 Gayza Tshachu (Gasa)
 Dhur Tshachu (Bumthang)
 Duenmang Tshachu (Zhemgang)
 Gelephu Tshachu (Sarpang)
 Khambalung gNey Tshachu (Lhuntse)
 Yoenten  KuenjungTshachu (Lhuntse)
 Pasalum Tshachu (Lhuentse)

Mineral springs
 Bjagay Menchu  (Paro)
 Dobji Menchu (Paro)
 Bjagay, Tokay, Mage-Phenday, Loyee Menchu (Gasa)
 Kabisa Menchu (Punakha)
 Dangchu Wangchu (Wangdue Phodrang)
 Ura Dangchu (Bumthang)
 Dangkhar Menchu (Zhemgang)
 Aja gNey Menchu (Mongar)
 Bharab Menchu and Chethag Menchu (Lhuentse)
 Menchugang Pho-mo Menchu (Lhuentse)
 Dhonphangma Menchu (Trashigang)
 Khabtey Menchu (Trashigang)
 Tokey Menchu (Gasa)
 Khowabokto Menchu (Phobjikha Valley)
 Gela Menchu (Phobjikha Valley)
 Zeeba Menchu (Phobjikha Valley)
 Pisting Menchu (Phobjikha Valley)
 Khasa Menchu  (Phobjikha Valley)
 Dungchen Menchu (Dagana District)
 Gewo Menchu
 Menchu Karp(Thimphu)
 Korphu Menchu (Trongsa)
 Zami Menchu (Gasa)
 Menchu Karp (Gasa)
 Ake Menchu (Gasa)
 Yame Menchu (Gasa)
 Bakey Menchu  (Gasa)
 Rekayzam Menchu (Wangdue Phodrang)

See also
 Bhutan
 Protected areas of Bhutan

References

External links
 

Hot springs and mineral springs
Hot springs